Jill Flint is an American television and film actress, best known for her role of Jill Casey in the USA Network TV series Royal Pains, and as the popular character Lana Delaney on CBS' award-winning series The Good Wife. She also plays one of the lead characters, Dr. Jordan Alexander, in the NBC medical drama The Night Shift, and had a recurring role on Bull as Diana Lindsay.

Personal life
She was born in Cherry Valley, New York, and lives in Brooklyn, New York.

Career

Flint has appeared in several feature films including Cadillac Records with Adrien Brody, and The Women. She appeared as Bex on Gossip Girl. She was a series regular in USA Network's hit series Royal Pains. She was also seen as recurring character FBI Agent Lana Delaney on The Good Wife (CBS). She starred on The Night Shift (NBC) as Dr. Jordan Alexander from 2014 to 2017. She also appeared as the on-again, off-again romantic interest to Dr. Jason Bull on the CBS series Bull.

Filmography

Film

Television

References

External links
 USA Network Profile
 
 Jordan Alexander in The Night Shift

21st-century American actresses
Actresses from New York (state)
American film actresses
American television actresses
Living people
People from Cherry Valley, New York
Year of birth missing (living people)